Pernell Whitaker vs. Julio César Chávez, billed as The Fight, was a professional boxing match contested on September 10, 1993, for the WBC welterweight title.

Background
Immediately following Pernell Whitaker's victory over Buddy McGirt on March 6, 1993, it was announced that a deal had been reached that would see Whitaker face reigning WBC light welterweight champion Julio César Chávez. The deal had been made prior to the McGirt–Whitaker bout and was to have happened regardless if Whitaker won or lost. Had Whitaker lost, his fight against Chávez would have been a unification bout for Whitaker's IBF light welterweight title and Chávez's WBC light welterweight title, but Whitaker's victory ensure the fight would instead be for his newly won WBC welterweight title instead. At the insistence of Chávez, the fight was held at a catch-weight of 145 pounds, two pounds under the official welterweight limit of 147 pounds.

The fight was highly anticipated as Chávez was the number one fighter on The Ring magazine's pound-for-pound list and Whitaker was number two. It was the first time in the history of The Ring magazine's pound-for-pound list that the two top ranked fighters on the pound-for-pound list had faced each other. When asked about becoming the number one fighter in the pound-for-pound rankings Whitaker stated "That is the title every man dreams of. This fight is the World Series, Super Bowl, NBA finals. It's boxing's two best fighters."

The fight
In one of the most disputed decisions in boxing history, the fight was declared a majority draw. Whitaker used his slick boxing skills to control the fight as Chávez had trouble landing punches consistently. Whitaker would dominate with his jab landing 130 to Chávez's face, and had the edge in overall punches with 311 punches landed compared to 220 for Chávez. However, when the fight went to the judge's scorecards only one judge, Jack Woodruff, had scored the fight in Whitaker's favor at 115–113. The other two judge's, Mickey Vann and Franz Marti, would score the fight even at 115–115.

Scorecards
Virtually every scorecard from the press had Whitaker as the clear winner
Associated Press: 116–112
Newsday: 116–112
The Ring Magazine: 117–111 
Sports Illustrated: 117–111
Washington Post: 115–113

Controversy and Aftermath
There was immediate outrage over the result with many publications feeling that Whitaker had been robbed of a victory. Most notably, the September 20, 1993 issue of Sports Illustrated featured Whitaker on the cover with the headline "ROBBED!." Virtually all of the blame was heaped on the two WBC appointed judges Mickey Vann of England and Franz Marti of Switzerland whom were accused of being selected by Chávez's promoter Don King and WBC president (and Chávez's countryman) José Sulaimán solely to protect Chávez. The selection of lone American judge who had scored the fight in favor of Whitaker Jack Woodruff had been protested by Sulaimán, King and Chávez but they eventually relented. Said Whitaker's manager and trainer Lou Duva of the judges, "Vann and Marti are W.B.C. officials. These guys get trips all over the world; they're beholden to Sulaiman and King. They wanted the American judge knocked out of there. Why? This decision speaks for itself." Duva also lamented "This is the second time this has happened to one of our fighters with Chávez." referring to Meldrick Taylor's loss to Chávez three years prior. Duva had recommended respected veteran judge Jerry Roth, but Chávez refused. Duva's opinion was that Roth was turned down" because he had Meldrick Taylor ahead when Taylor fought Chávez."

Dan Duva would launch an official protest only four days after the fight in hopes of getting the decision overturned in favor of Whitaker. The protest concerned the scoring of the sixth round of the bout in which referee Joe Cortez briefly halted the fight to allow Chávez to recover after Whitaker landed a low-blow. As Cortez believed the blow was unintentional, he did not instruct the judges to deduct a point from Whitaker on the scorecards. Whitaker would win the round 10–9 on both Woodruff and Marti's scorecard but Vann scored the round 10–9 in Chávez's favor. Vann was quoted in the Daily Express stating "The referee didn't take off a point, but I thought it had to be done.", which would be a violation as boxing rules state that only a referee can deduct points during the fight. However, in an interview with ESPN's Charley Steiner, Vann denied any wrongdoing and stated that he scored the fight correctly. The following month, the protest was withdrawn.

Fight card

References

1993 in boxing
Boxing matches
1993 in sports in Texas
Boxing on Showtime
Boxing in Texas
September 1993 sports events in the United States